The 1954 All-Ireland Senior Camogie Championship Final was the 23rd All-Ireland Final and the deciding match of the 1954 All-Ireland Senior Camogie Championship, an inter-county camogie tournament for the top teams in Ireland.

Dublin completely dominated the game: they led 6-2 to 0-1 at the break, the Derry side having only entered their opponent's half with the sliotar three times. Dublin eased off in the second half and won an eighth All-Ireland in a row.

References

All-Ireland Senior Camogie Championship Finals
All-Ireland Senior Camogie Championship Final
All-Ireland Senior Camogie Championship Final
All-Ireland Senior Camogie Championship Final
All-Ireland Senior Camogie Championship Final, 1954
Dublin county camogie team matches